Picacho may refer to:

Mexico
Villa de Hidalgo, San Luis Potosí
Picacho del Diablo, Baja California

Panama
Picacho Mountain

United States
Picacho, California
Picacho State Recreation Area
Little Picacho Wilderness, California
Picacho, Arizona
Picacho Peak State Park, Arizona
Battle of Picacho Pass
Picacho, New Mexico

Venezuela
Picacho de El Volcán, Miranda

See also
Pikachu (disambiguation)
El Picacho (disambiguation)